Pennsylvania Route 643 (PA 643) is a  state highway located in Fulton County, Pennsylvania.  The eastern terminus is at U.S. Route 522 (US 522) in Bethel Township.  The western terminus is at Interstate 70 (I-70) in Brush Creek Township.

Route description

PA 643 begins at an interchange with I-70 in Brush Creek Township, heading south on two-lane undivided Old 126. The route crosses forested Town Hill before heading into agricultural areas, forking to the southeast onto Flickerville Road. The road passes through the residential community of Town Hill before ascending forested Sideling Hill. PA 643 curves northeast to reach the summit of the hill, at which point it makes a sharp turn to the south into Bethel Township to descend the hill. The road comes to the community of Sideling Hill and turns east into agricultural areas with some woods and homes. The route heads southeast before turning south and coming to its eastern terminus at US 522.

Major intersections

See also

References

External links

Pennsylvania Highways: PA 643

643
Transportation in Fulton County, Pennsylvania